Neat and scruffy are two contrasting approaches to artificial intelligence (AI) research. The distinction was made in the 70s and was a subject of discussion until the middle 80s. In the 1990s and 21st century AI research adopted "neat" approaches almost exclusively and these have proven to be the most successful.

"Neats" use algorithms based on formal paradigms such as logic, mathematical optimization or neural networks. Neat researchers and analysts have expressed the hope that a single formal paradigm can be extended and improved to achieve general intelligence and superintelligence. 

"Scruffies" use any number of different algorithms and methods to achieve intelligent behavior. Scruffy programs may require large amounts of hand coding or knowledge engineering. Scruffies have argued that the general intelligence can only be implemented by solving a large number of essentially unrelated problems, and that there is no magic bullet that will allow programs to develop general intelligence autonomously. 

The neat approach is similar to physics, in that it uses simple mathematical models as its foundation. The scruffy approach is more like biology, where much of the work involves studying and categorizing diverse phenomena.

Origin in the 1970s
The distinction between neat and scruffy originated in the mid-1970s, by Roger Schank. Schank used the terms to characterize the difference between his work on natural language processing (which represented commonsense knowledge in the form of large amorphous semantic networks) from the work of John McCarthy, Allen Newell, Herbert A. Simon, Robert Kowalski and others whose work was based on logic and formal extensions of logic. Schank described himself as an AI scruffy. He made this distinction in linguistics, arguing strongly against Chomsky's view of language.

The distinction was also partly geographical and cultural: "scruffy" attributes were exemplified by AI research at MIT under Marvin Minsky in the 1970s. The laboratory was famously "freewheeling" and researchers often developed AI programs by spending long hours fine-tuning programs until they showed the required behavior.  Important and influential "scruffy" programs developed at MIT included Joseph Weizenbaum's ELIZA, which behaved as if it spoke English, without any formal knowledge at all, and Terry Winograd's SHRDLU, which could successfully answer queries and carry out actions in a simplified world consisting of blocks and a robot arm. SHRDLU, while successful, could not be scaled up into a useful natural language processing system, because it lacked a structured design. Maintaining a larger version of the program proved to be impossible, i.e. it was too scruffy to be extended.

Other AI laboratories (of which the largest were Stanford, Carnegie Mellon University and the University of Edinburgh) focused on logic and formal problem solving as a basis for AI. These institutions supported the work of John McCarthy, Herbert Simon, Allen Newell, Donald Michie, Robert Kowalski, and other "neats".

The contrast between MIT's approach and other laboratories was also described as a "procedural/declarative distinction". Programs like SHRDLU were designed as agents that carried out actions. They executed "procedures". Other programs were designed as inference engines that manipulated formal statements (or "declarations") about the world and translated these manipulations into actions. 

In his 1983 presidential address to Association for the Advancement of Artificial Intelligence, Nils Nilsson discussed the issue, arguing that "the field needed both". He wrote "much of the knowledge we want our programs to have can and should be represented declaratively in some kind of declarative, logic-like formalism. Ad hoc structures have their place, but most of these come from the domain itself." Alex P. Pentland and Martin Fischler of SRI International concurred about the anticipated role of deduction and logic-like formalisms in future AI research, but not to the extent that Nilsson described.

Scruffy projects in the 1980s

The scruffy approach was applied to robotics by Rodney Brooks in the mid-1980s. He advocated building robots that were, as he put it, Fast, Cheap and Out of Control, the title of a 1989 paper co-authored with Anita Flynn. Unlike earlier robots such as Shakey or the Stanford cart, they did not build up representations of the world by analyzing visual information with algorithms drawn from mathematical machine learning techniques, and they did not plan their actions using formalizations based on logic, such as the 'Planner' language. They simply reacted to their sensors in a way that tended to help them survive and move.

Douglas Lenat's Cyc project was initiated in 1984 one of earliest and most ambitious projects to capture all of human knowledge in machine readable form, is "a determinedly scruffy enterprise". The Cyc database contains millions of facts about all the complexities of the world, each of which must be entered one at a time, by knowledge engineers. Each of these entries is an ad hoc addition to the intelligence of the system. While there may be a "neat" solution to the problem of commonsense knowledge (such as machine learning algorithms with natural language processing that could study the text available over the internet), no such project has yet been successful.

The Society of Mind 

In 1986 Marvin Minsky published The Society of Mind which advocated a view of intelligence and the mind as an interacting community of modules or agents that each handled different aspects of cognition, where some modules were specialized for very specific tasks (e.g. edge detection in the visual cortex) and other modules were specialized to manage communication and prioritization (e.g. planning and attention in the frontal lobes). Minsky presented this paradigm as a model of both biological human intelligence and as a blueprint for future work in AI. 

This paradigm is explicitly "scruffy" in that it does not expect there to be a single algorithm that can be applied to all of the tasks involved in intelligent behavior. Minsky wrote: 

As of 1991, Minsky was still publishing papers evaluating the relative advantages of the neat versus scruffy approaches, e.g. “Logical Versus Analogical or Symbolic Versus Connectionist or Neat Versus
Scruffy”.

"The victory of neats" in the 1990s 
New statistical and mathematical approaches to AI were developed in the 1990s, using highly developed formalisms such as mathematical optimization and neural networks. This general trend towards more formal methods in AI is described as "the victory of the neats" by Peter Norvig and Stuart Russell. Pamela McCorduck wrote that "As I write, AI enjoys a Neat hegemony, people who believe that machine intelligence, at least, is best expressed in logical, even mathematical terms."

Neat solutions to problems such as machine learning and computer vision have been highly successful in the 21st century. These solutions, however, have mostly been applied to specific problems with specific solutions, and the problem of Artificial general intelligence (AGI) remains unsolved.

The terms "neat" and "scruffy" are not often used by AI researchers in the 21st century, with some exceptions such as talks by Karl Friston on the Free energy principle, where he refers to physicists as "Neats" and AI researchers as "Scruffies" (and philosophers as "Mystics").

Well-known examples

Neats

 John McCarthy
 Allen Newell
 Herbert A. Simon
 Edward Feigenbaum
 Robert Kowalski
 Judea Pearl

Scruffies

 Rodney Brooks
 Terry Winograd
 Marvin Minsky
 Roger Schank
 Doug Lenat

See also

 History of artificial intelligence
 
 Soft computing
 Symbolic AI
 Philosophy of artificial intelligence

Notes

Citations

References
 
 .
 
 
 .
 .

Further reading

 
 

Philosophy of artificial intelligence